Omutumwa (Oshiwambo: "messenger") is a bi-weekly Ovambo-language newspaper based in Windhoek, Namibia. The paper ran its first edition on 29 September 2010 and has a print run of 5,000. The newspaper is published by Victor Angula Franciscus, who formerly worked at Katutura Community Radio.

References

2010 establishments in Namibia
Mass media in Windhoek
Newspapers published in Namibia
Ovambo-language mass media
Publications established in 2010